Now Here's Johnny Cash is a compilation album by American singer-songwriter Johnny Cash. It was released on June 26, 1961, by Sun Records after Cash had left the label and signed with Columbia Records. The album is made up of songs Cash recorded for Sun prior to leaving the label. The album was re-issued in 2003 by Varèse Sarabande, with five bonus tracks. In 2007 it was re-released with Greatest! on one CD.

Track listing

Personnel
Johnny Cash - Vocals, Rhythm guitar
Luther Perkins - Lead guitar
Marshall Grant - Bass 
Al Casey - Guitar
Additional personnel 
Sam Phillips - Producer
Jack Clement - Producer
Cary E. Mansfield - Reissue Producer
Bill Dahl - Liner Notes, Reissue Producer
Dan Hersch - Digital Remastering
Bill Pitzonka - Art Direction, Design

Charts
Singles - Billboard (United States)

References

Now Here's Johnny Cash
Now Here's Johnny Cash
Albums produced by Sam Phillips
Albums produced by Jack Clement
Sun Records albums
Albums recorded at Sun Studio